Caroline Mary Luard (née Hartley; 1850 – 24 August 1908) was the victim of an unsolved murder, known as the Seal Chart Murder, after she was mysteriously shot and killed at an isolated summerhouse in a heavily wooded area near Ightham, Kent. Her husband, Major-General Luard, later committed suicide. It has since been suggested that John Dickman, who was hanged for killing a passenger on a train in 1910, may have been involved in her death.

Background 

Caroline Luard was born Caroline Mary Hartley in the last quarter of 1850, in Egremont, Cumberland, youngest daughter of Thomas Hartley of Gillfoot. In the summer of 1875 she married Charles Edward Luard and had two sons by him – Charles Elmhirst Luard, born in August 1876, and Eric Dalbiac Luard, born April 1878. Elmhirst was the surname of Charles Luard's mother, while Dalbiac referred back to Charles's grandmother, Louisa Dalbiac (1761–1830), who had married Captain Peter John Luard (1754–1830) in 1784.

Charles Edward Luard, born in Edinburgh in 1837, was twelve years older than his wife. At the time of his birth his father, Tommy Luard, was a Captain in the Royal Artillery. Like many in his family, Luard was a professional Military Officer and had retired with the rank of Major-General in the Royal Engineers. He had done so despite an incident during his career that might have ruined his chances of promotion. This related to the defeat of British forces by the Zulu at the Battle of Isandhlwana in 1889, a reversal that was largely blamed on Colonel Anthony Durnford. However, it was rumoured that Durnford's orders had been stolen from his body after the battle, in order to absolve Lieutenant-General Frederic Thesiger, 2nd Baron Chelmsford and other senior officers of incompetence.

The fight to re-establish Durnford's reputation was led by his brother, Edward Durnford; Durnford's fiancée, Miss Frances Ellen Colenso, daughter of John William Colenso; the Bishop of Natal; and Charles Edward Luard. Luard made himself party to a letter-writing campaign, accusing fellow officers of a conspiracy to blacken Durnford's name. He was subsequently court-martialled and censured for his actions.

Luard had entered the army in 1859 and, in 1871, was executive officer in London during the Fenian disturbances. In the same year he wrote to the Commissioner of the City Police with a report on the defensive state of Newgate Gaol, following a visit there in the company of the Commissioner and the City Architect. The letter included a sketch plan for rebuilding part of the prison wall. He was involved in building the Household Cavalry barracks in Windsor and the United Services Recreation Ground in Portsmouth; it is also said that he devised the scheme for the rearmament of Gibraltar.

He served in Bermuda and Corfu as well as in Gibraltar and Natal. At the time of the 1881 Census he was living in Wymering, Hampshire with his wife and two young sons and a staff consisting of a cook, a parlour maid, and a nurse. Six years later he retired and in 1888 moved to a house named Ightham Knoll, just outside the village of Ightham near Sevenoaks in Kent.

Luard served as a Kent County Councillor and was made a Justice of the Peace. He became a Governor of Shipbourne School, close to his home, where he also performed the role of Local Inspector of Art and Drawing. In January 1899, he published a leaflet entitled ‘'An Association of the Managers and Governors of Schools for the Working Classes in the United Kingdom’', being a proposal for the establishment of such an association.

In 1901, he was heavily involved in the establishment of the Society of Miniature Rifle Clubs. This was because the Boer War had shown the vulnerability of the British Army to mere farmers who were able to shoot accurately from long distances. This led to Luard and Earl Roberts recommending that working men should be able to shoot a rifle, so that Britain could defend itself against invasion.

Luard also formed the Patriotic Party in 1907. His wife involved herself in charity work in the neighbourhood. It would be no exaggeration to say that they were pillars of late-Victorian society.

Both of the Luards' sons joined the British Army, both died young as a result of their service. Eric Luard died in 1903, while still in his mid-twenties, from a fever contracted while on service in Africa. His brother, Charles, died in France in September 1914.

The murder 

On 24 August 1908, at about 2.30pm, Major-General Luard and his wife left their home and went for a walk with their dog. According to Major-General Luard's account, they had two very different purposes. He wished to retrieve his golf clubs from the clubhouse at Godden Green Golf Club prior to a holiday that he and his wife were intending to take, while Mrs Luard merely wanted to take some exercise before returning home where she was expecting a Mrs Stewart, wife of a local solicitor, for afternoon tea.

Accordingly, having walked about a mile from their home, along the road that passed close to St Lawrence's Church and the associated school, at 3.00pm they parted ways at a wicket gate. This gate let on to a path that led to a ‘bungalow summer house’ known as ‘La Casa’, owned by the Luards’ neighbours, the Wilkinsons of Frankfield House, and which both families were accustomed to using from time to time. Beyond the summer house was a path through the woods which would allow Mrs Luard to return home in good time for her visitor.

Major-General Luard, meanwhile, set off in the direction of the Golf Course and was seen at various times during the next hour. At 3.20pm, he was seen by Thomas Durrand at Hall Farm. Between 3.25 and 3.30pm, Major-General Luard was observed by a labourer some 400 yards from the golf links and again, by the same man, between 3.35 and 3.40pm. At 3.35pm, he was seen by the Golf Club Steward, on the links.

Having collected his clubs, at 4.05pm Major-General Luard met the local vicar, Rev. A. B. Cotton, who was in his motor car and apparently driving in the opposite direction. Cotton nevertheless took Luard's golf clubs, presumably to save him the trouble of carrying them any further and in the expectation of returning shortly in the right direction. This occurred at 4.20pm, when Rev. Cotton stopped to pick up Luard, depositing him and his golf clubs at Ightham Knoll at around 4.25pm.

At home Major-General Luard found Mrs. Stewart awaiting the return of Mrs Luard. Consequently, Luard set off in search of his wife by the woodland route, at approximately 4.30pm. He eventually found her, at about 5.15pm, on the verandah of the summer house which was otherwise locked and empty. She had been shot in the head, and her three rings and purse were missing. No cartridges were found at the scene, merely some “disappearing footprints”.

The time of Mrs Luard's murder was estimated to be 3.15pm, when Major-General Luard was walking towards the Golf Clubhouse. Three shots were heard at about that time by two witnesses – Annie Wickham (55), a long-standing local resident and wife of a coachman, and Daniel Kettel (58), a gardener. Annie claimed the shots came from the direction of the summer house. She was at the Wilkinsons' home at Frankfield House at the time – about 500 yards from the summer house.

The aftermath 
Scotland Yard was immediately involved in the investigation and two bloodhounds, named Sceptre and Solferino, owned by a Major Richardson of Stratford-upon-Avon, were brought in to sniff out the route by which the killer had made his escape. However, the trail apparently went cold at the main road.

The initial inquest hearing into Mrs Luard's death was held at Ightham Knoll, the Luard's own home, on 26 August 1908. Dr Mansfield, who had carried out the post-mortem examination of Mrs Luard, reported that she had initially been hit on the back of the head and that the blow had been of sufficient force to knock her to the ground, where she had vomited. Her killer had then shot her behind her right ear, with a second shot being fired into her left cheek.

Prior to the inquest Luard had been encouraged to write an account of the events of the afternoon of 24 August, about which he was questioned at some length.  In describing his discovery of his wife's body he stated that, ‘I then examined her dress and found that it was torn. Her pocket at the back of the skirt had been torn open. One of her gloves, which was lying near, was inside out, as though it had been torn off. She had both gloves on when she left me. I then looked at her hands, and saw that her rings were missing. She wore all her rings on the left hand, and always wore them, except when she washed her hands. One of the rings was over a hundred years old. It was an heirloom given to her by her mother. It was of an old design of mounting.’

Luard admitted that he owned three revolvers. However, he claimed to be unable to remember where he kept his ammunition. London gun expert Edwin Churchill stated that, after examining the two bullets, he had concluded that they had come from a .320 revolver, which had been fired when the gun was no more than a few inches away from Mrs Luard's head. He also said that none of Luard's own revolvers would have been capable of firing such bullets, since his guns were all of much smaller calibre.

The police hoped that the pocket that had been ripped off the dress would lead them to her murderer; however, it was found at Ightham Knoll, on the day before Mrs Luard's funeral, by a maid who was shaking out the sheet in which Mrs Luard's body had been carried back to the house from 'La Casa'. It was also hoped that the rings would be sold or pawned and so provide a trail to the murderer, but they were never seen again.

The inquest resumed a fortnight later at the George & Dragon Inn, Ightham. General Luard was again questioned and was asked by the coroner if he was aware of 'any incident in the life of the deceased or yourself which in your opinion would cause any person to entertain any feelings of revenge or jealously towards either of you?' Luard replied 'No' and said that neither of them had received any letters suggesting that there had been such an incident. He also denied the allegation that his wife had received a letter prior to her death from someone seeking to make an appointment with her.

Since Mrs Luard's death, a whispering campaign had been under way that suggested that her husband was the murderer and that the theft of her rings was merely a device to throw the police off his track. Now Luard began to receive anonymous letters accusing him of the shooting. The volume of these letters and their vitriolic contents apparently persuaded him that he should leave the district; he advertised the remainder of the lease on Ightham Knoll for sale and made arrangements to have the house's contents put up for auction. In the meantime he was aware that his son, having learnt of his mother's death, was returning from South Africa to be with him and would be arriving in Southampton on 18 September.

Luard was invited to stay with Colonel Charles Edward Warde, the local Member of Parliament and brother of the Chief Constable of Kent, Henry Warde. Colonel Warde collected him at the end of the inquest proceedings on 17 September and drove him to his home, Barham Court, near Wateringbury. In the morning, Luard bathed and breakfasted, and then spent some time writing letters to his son and to Colonel Warde. He then walked to the railway line at Teston, hid in some bushes, and jumped in front of the 9.09 train from Maidstone West to Tonbridge. He had pinned a note to his coat saying, 'Whoever finds me take me to Colonel Warde'.

On hearing of Luard's death, Colonel Warde went to Southampton and broke the news to Luard's son, Captain Charles Luard, in the cabin of the steamer on which he had just arrived.

The eventual verdict of the inquest on Mrs Luard was 'murder by person or persons unknown'. Later on, it was determined that General Luard had committed 'suicide while temporarily insane'.

A month later it was reported that an Inspector Jarvis of Scotland Yard had been in Winnipeg for three weeks and expected to apprehend Mrs Luard's murderer at any moment. Jarvis was said to be in Canada, on no salary, purely in the expectation that he would receive the £1,000 reward that was on offer for the killer's arrest. However, no arrest was ever made.

The idea that the murderer was a gypsy, hop-picker, or itinerant, with a revolver in his pocket, who was prepared to perpetrate a random killing for the sake of a few rings (of which he would have been unaware until he tore the glove from Mrs Luard's dead hand) was generally dismissed.  The police seem to have believed that the killer was known to Mrs Luard, that the crime was planned, and that the theft of the rings was an attempt to mislead them about the motive for the murder.

There has been speculation that the killer was John Dickman who, in 1910, was sentenced to death for the murder of a man named Nisbet on a train in Morpeth. Dickman's conviction was considered unsafe by a number of people, including five of the jury that found him guilty and who later signed a petition calling for him to be reprieved. Sir Sidney Orme Rowan-Hamilton, who was Chief Justice of Bermuda in the 1930s and who wrote a book about the Dickman case in 1914, seems to have been convinced that Dickman murdered Mrs Luard. He believed that she had responded to an advertisement that Dickman had placed in The Times, asking for financial help, by sending him a cheque. Dickman had subsequently forged this cheque - presumably by changing the amount - and when Mrs Luard discovered this, she contacted him and arranged to meet him without her husband's knowledge.

It has also been claimed that the judge who tried Dickman, the three Appeal Court judges who heard and rejected his appeal, and the Home Secretary, Winston Churchill, who refused to commute Dickman's death sentence, were all friends of Major-General Luard and bent on avenging his and his wife's death.

In popular culture
British author Minette Walters fictionalized the story of Mrs Luard's death in the novella, A Dreadful Murder (2013).

Osbert Sitwell fictionalized the case in the short story "The Greeting".

Family
Caroline Mary née Hartley (1850–1908) was the youngest daughter of Thomas Hartley JP (1802-1855) of Gillfoot, Egremont, Cumbria and his wife Georgianna Elizabeth née Rimington (1814–1878);

Charles Edward Luard (1839–1908) was the second son of Robert Luard (1800–1880) and his first wife Mary née Elmhirst (1808–1841)

Major Charles Elmhirst Luard DSO (1876–1914) married Dorothy Frances née Barrett (1885–1978). He was killed in action at Missy-sur-Aisne
Charles William Hartley Luard (1914–1928)
Lt Edward Dalbiac Luard (1878–1903), died on active service in Somaliland

See also
List of unsolved murders in the United Kingdom

Notes

References

Further reading
Adam, Hargrave Lee. The Police Encyclopaedia. London: Waverly Book Company. 
Janes, Diane. Edwardian Murder: Ightham & the Morpeth Train Robbery. Stroud: Sutton Publishing.
Symons, Julian. A Reasonable Doubt. London: Cresset Press

External links
The Murder of Caroline Luard at Spartacus Educational

1850 births
1908 deaths
1908 murders in the United Kingdom
British murder victims
Female murder victims
History of Kent
People from Egremont, Cumbria
People from Ightham
People murdered in England
Unsolved murders in England